The Story of the Chevalier des Grieux and Manon Lescaut is a novel by Antoine François Prévost. Published in 1731, it is the seventh and final volume of Mémoires et aventures d'un homme de qualité (Memoirs and Adventures of a Man of Quality).

The story, set in France and Louisiana in the early 18th century, follows the hero, the Chevalier des Grieux, and his lover, Manon Lescaut. Controversial in its time, the work was banned in France upon publication. Despite this, it became very popular and pirated editions were widely distributed. In a subsequent 1753 edition, the Abbé Prévost toned down some scandalous details and injected more moralizing disclaimers. The work was to become the most reprinted book in French Literature, with over 250 editions published between 1731 and 1981.

Plot summary

Seventeen-year-old Des Grieux, studying philosophy at Amiens, comes from a noble and landed family, but forfeits his hereditary wealth and incurs the disappointment of his father by running away with Manon on her way to a convent. In Paris, the young lovers enjoy a blissful cohabitation, while Des Grieux struggles to satisfy Manon's taste for luxury. He acquires money by borrowing from his unwaveringly loyal friend Tiberge and by cheating gamblers. On several occasions, Des Grieux's wealth evaporates (by theft, in a house fire, etc.), prompting Manon to leave him for a richer man because she cannot stand the thought of living in penury.

The two lovers finally end up in New Orleans, to which Manon has been deported as a prostitute, where they pretend to be married and live in idyllic peace for a while. But when Des Grieux reveals their unmarried state to the Governor, Étienne Perier, and asks to be wed to Manon, Perier's nephew, Synnelet sets his sights on winning Manon's hand. In despair, Des Grieux challenges Synnelet to a duel and knocks him unconscious. Thinking he has killed the man, and fearing retribution, the couple flee New Orleans and venture into the wilderness of Louisiana, hoping to reach an English settlement. Manon dies of exposure and exhaustion the following morning and, after burying his beloved, Des Grieux is eventually taken back to France by Tiberge.

Adaptations

Dramas, operas and ballets
Manon Lescaut (1830), a ballet by Jean-Louis Aumer
Manon Lescaut (1856), an opera by French composer Daniel Auber
Manon (1884), an opera by French composer Jules Massenet
Manon Lescaut (1893), an opera by Italian composer Giacomo Puccini
Manon Lescaut (1940), a drama in verse by Czech poet Vítězslav Nezval
Boulevard Solitude (1952) "Lyrisches Drama" (lyric drama) or opera by German composer Hans Werner Henze
Manon (first performed in 1884), a ballet with music by Jules Massenet and choreography by Kenneth MacMillan
Manon (2015), a musical written for the Takarazuka troupe by librettist/director Keiko Ueda and composer Joy Son

Films
Manon Lescaut (1926), directed by Arthur Robison, with Lya de Putti
When a Man Loves (1927), directed by Alan Crosland, with John Barrymore and Dolores Costello
Manon Lescaut (1940), directed by Carmine Gallone, with Vittorio de Sica and Alida Valli
Manon (1949), directed by Henri-Georges Clouzot, with Michel Auclair and Cécile Aubry
 The Lovers of Manon Lescaut (1954), directed by Mario Costa
Manon 70 (1968), directed by Jean Aurel, with Catherine Deneuve and Sami Frey
Manón (1986), Venezuelan movie directed by Román Chalbaud, with Mayra Alejandra
Manon Lescaut (2013), directed by Gabriel Aghion, with Céline Perreau and Samuel Theis

Translations
English translations of the original 1731 version of the novel include Helen Waddell's (1931). For the 1753 revision there are translations by, among others, L. W. Tancock (Penguin, 1949—though he divides the 2-part novel into a number of chapters), Donald M. Frame (Signet, 1961—which notes differences between the 1731 and 1753 editions), Angela Scholar (Oxford, 2004, with extensive notes and commentary), and Andrew Brown (Hesperus, 2004, with a foreword by Germaine Greer).

Henri Valienne (1854–1908), a physician and author of the first novel in the constructed language Esperanto, translated Manon Lescaut into that language.  His translation was published at Paris in 1908, and reissued by the British Esperanto Association in 1926.

Citations

Additional references
 
 
 
 Kunitz, Stanley J. & Colby, Vineta (1967). François Prévost, Antoine in European Authors 1000–1900, pp. 743–44. H.W. Wilson Company, New York.

Bibliography
  Sylviane Albertan-Coppola, Abbé Prévost : Manon Lescaut, Paris: Presses universitaires de France, 1995 .
  André Billy, L'Abbé Prévost, Paris: Flammarion, 1969.
  René Démoris, Le Silence de Manon, Paris: Presses universitaires de France, 1995 .
 Patrick Brady, Structuralist perspectives in criticism of fiction : essays on Manon Lescaut and La Vie de Marianne, P. Lang, Berne ; Las Vegas, 1978.
 Patrick Coleman, Reparative realism : mourning and modernity in the French novel, 1730–1830, Geneva: Droz, 1998 .
  Maurice Daumas, Le Syndrome des Grieux : la relation père/fils au XVIIIe siècle, Paris: Seuil, 1990 .
 R. A. Francis, The abbé Prévost's first-person narrators, Oxford: Voltaire Foundation, 1993.
  Eugène Lasserre, Manon Lescaut de l'abbé Prévost, Paris: Société Française d'Éditions Littéraires et Techniques, 1930.
  Paul Hazard, Études critiques sur Manon Lescaut, Chicago: The University of Chicago Press, 1929.
  Pierre Heinrich, L'Abbé Prévost et la Louisiane ; étude sur la valeur historique de Manon Lescaut Paris: E. Guilmoto, 1907.
  Claudine Hunting, La Femme devant le "tribunal masculin" dans trois romans des Lumières : Challe, Prévost, Cazotte, New York: P. Lang, 1987 .
  Jean Luc Jaccard, Manon Lescaut, le personnage-romancier, Paris: A.-G. Nizet, 1975 .
  Eugène Lasserre, Manon Lescaut de l'abbé Prévost, Paris: Société française d'Éditions littéraires et techniques, 1930.
  Roger Laufer, Style rococo, style des Lumières, Paris: J. Corti, 1963.
  Vivienne Mylne, Prévost : Manon Lescaut, London: Edward Arnold, 1972.
  René Picard, Introduction à l'Histoire du chevalier des Grieux et de Manon Lescaut, Paris: Garnier, 1965, pp. cxxx–cxxxxvii.
 Naomi Segal, The Unintended Reader : feminism and Manon Lescaut, Cambridge; New York: Cambridge University Press, 1986 .
  Alan Singerman, L'Abbé Prévost : L'amour et la morale, Geneva: Droz, 1987.
  Jean Sgard, L'Abbé Prévost : labyrinthes de la mémoire, Paris: PUF, 1986 .
  Jean Sgard, Prévost romancier, Paris: José Corti, 1968 .
  Loïc Thommeret, La Mémoire créatrice. Essai sur l'écriture de soi au XVIIIe siècle, Paris: L'Harmattan, 2006, .
 Arnold L. Weinstein, Fictions of the self, 1550–1800, Princeton: Princeton University Press, 1981 .

External links

 Full texts at Project Gutenberg in the original French and in an English translation
 
 Manon Lescaut on World Wide School
 Images from an illustrated 1885 French edition
  Manon Lescaut, audio version 

1731 novels
French romance novels
Novels set in the 18th century
Novels set in Louisiana
Novels set in Paris
Novels set in New Orleans
French novels adapted into films
Novels adapted into ballets
Novels adapted into operas
Lescaut, Manon
Lescaut, Manon